Brianne Nicole Howey (born May 24, 1989) is an American actress. She had main roles in the Fox series The Exorcist (2016) and The Passage (2019). She had a recurring role in the first season of The CW's superhero drama Batwoman (2019–2020) as Reagan Pye. As of 2021, she stars as Georgia Miller in the Netflix comedy-drama Ginny & Georgia (2021–present).

Early life 
Howey was raised in Pasadena, California, by her young and single mother, whom she later took inspiration from in her role as Georgia, and is the oldest of five siblings. She attended Flintridge Sacred Heart Academy, an all girls' Catholic high school in Pasadena, where she joined the improv team. She continued her acting education and studied theatre at New York University Tisch School of the Arts, and the Lee Strasberg Theatre and Film Institute. During her time as a student, she starred in the short films Party Favors in 2008, Appropriate Sex in 2009, and Suckerpunch in 2010.

Career 
Her first TV role was on 90210, when she played Stacy while continuing at NYU. Howey has starred in Twisted Tales in 2013.

In 2014, Brianne starred as Candy in the comedy film Horrible Bosses 2 alongside Jason Bateman.  In 2015, Brianne moved to London to film her first regular starring role which was in the British television series I Live with Models. In 2016, Howey landed the role of Kat Rance in the television series The Exorcist, sister of the possessed girl played by Hannah Kasulka. In 2019, Howey starred as Shauna Babcock, a "Viral", in Justin Cronin's The Passage. The same year, Howey began a recurring role as Alison B. in Hulu's Dollface. She returned for season 2 in February 2022. She also had a role in the 2019 romantic comedy Plus One.

Howey attracted further attention for her role as Georgia in the Netflix series Ginny & Georgia. The series was released on February 24, 2021, and quickly became popular, attracting 52 million subscribers on Netflix. It was renewed for a second season on April 19, 2021. The second season premiered on January 5, 2023.

Filmography

Film

Television

References

External links 
 
Interview with NBC New York
Podcast interview with Anthony Meindl

Living people
1989 births
21st-century American actresses
Actresses from California
Actresses from Pasadena, California
American film actresses
American television actresses
People from Pasadena, California
Tisch School of the Arts alumni